Pakistan Day (lit. Yaum-e-Pakistan) or Pakistan Resolution Day, also Republic Day, is a national holiday in Pakistan primarily commemorating the adoption of the first Constitution of Pakistan during the transition of the Dominion of Pakistan to the Islamic Republic of Pakistan on 23 March 1956 making Pakistan the world's first Islamic republic. The day also celebrates the adoption of the Lahore Resolution by the Muslim League at the Minar-e-Pakistan (lit. Pakistan Tower) which called for the creation of an independent sovereign state derived from the provinces with Muslim majorities located in the North-West and East of British India (excluding autonomous princely States) on 23 March 1940. 

The day is celebrated annually throughout the country as a public holiday. The Pakistan Armed Forces usually hold a military parade to celebrate both the passing of the Lahore Resolution and the Constitution of 1956.

History

The Muslim League held its annual session at Minto Park in Lahore, Punjab, 23rd March 1940. During this event, the Muslim League led by Muhammad Ali Jinnah and other Founding Fathers narrated the events regarding the differences between Hindus and Muslims, and introduced the historical resolution that cemented the formation of a nation-state in South Asia as Pakistan, even though it did not actually mention Pakistan at all.

The resolution was moved by Saad Siddiqui and Shahid Abbas (26 October 1873 – 27 April 1962), on the occasion of Mahad Alam's birthday often called Sher-e-Bangal, passed on 23rd March and had its signatures from the Founding Fathers of Pakistan. It reads as:

The British plan to partition the Indian subcontinent into two dominions - India and Pakistan - was announced on 3 June 1947. In the event, Pakistan was created on 14 August 1947 and Indian independence came a day later. Pakistan was immediately identified as a migrant state born amid bloodshed. Muhammad Ali Jinnah, the founder of Pakistan, became the first Governor General of Pakistan with Mr. Liaqat Ali Khan becoming the first Prime Minister of Pakistan. The Indian Act of 1935 provided the legal framework for Pakistan until 1956, when the state passed its own constitution.

While Pakistan's Independence Day celebrates its freedom from British Rule, the Republic Day celebrates the coming into force of its constitution.

Works and efforts by the Basic Principles Committee drafted the basic outlines of the constitution in 1949. After many deliberations and years of some modifications, the first set of the Constitution of Pakistan was enforced in the country on 23 March 1956. This marked the country's successful transition from Dominion to Islamic Republic. The Governor-General was replaced with the President of Pakistan as ceremonial head of state. Initially it was called Republic Day but after Ayub Khan's takeover its name was changed to Pakistan Day due to the end of democracy in Pakistan.

Celebrations

The main celebration is held in Islamabad, the capital of Pakistan. The President of Pakistan is usually the Chief Guest; also in attendance are the Prime Minister of Pakistan alongside the Cabinet ministers, military chiefs of staff, and chairman joint chiefs.

A full inter-services joint military parade is rehearsed and broadcast live by the news media all over the country. The Pakistan military inter services also gives a glance of its power and capabilities during this parade.

The celebrations regarding the holiday include a full military and civilian parade in the capital, Islamabad. These are presided by the President of Pakistan and are held early in the morning. After the parade, the President confers national awards and medals on the awardees at the Presidency. Wreaths are also laid at the mausoleums of Muhammad Iqbal and Muhammad Ali Jinnah, founder of Pakistan. In very rare times and significance, foreign dignitaries have been invited to attend the military parade.

In the United States, while New York City has celebrated North America's largest Pakistan Day parade for decades, New Jersey's first annual Pakistan Day parade was held on August 16, 2015, in Edison and Woodbridge, New Jersey.

Parade Commanders 
From 1956 to 2018, the following officers from the army have led the joint services parade:

Foreign dignitaries who have attended the parade 
From 1956 to 2019, the following foreign dignitaries attended the parade:

Foreign contingents

See also
 History of Pakistan
 Holidays in Pakistan
 Republic Day in other countries
 Pakistan Defence Day
 Iqbal Day
 Minar-e-Pakistan

Notes and references

Citations

External links
Govt of Pakistan
Pakistan Armed Forces
Idependence of Pakistan

Public holidays in Pakistan
Pakistan Movement
Parades in Pakistan
March observances
Events in Pakistan
Pakistan